Steven Devonne Outerbridge (born 20 May 1983) is a Bermudian cricketer. He is a left-handed batsman and a right-arm off-break bowler. He has played for Bermuda in seven One Day Internationals to date, making his debut at this level against Canada in August 2006. He has also represented Bermuda in four ICC Intercontinental Cup matches and the ICC Americas Championship in 2004 and 2006. In the 2006 English cricket season he played several matches for Cardiff UCCE.

In April 2018, he was named in Bermuda's squad for the 2018 ICC World Cricket League Division Four tournament in Malaysia. He last represented Bermuda in 2013.

References

External links
 

1983 births
Living people
Bermudian cricketers
Bermuda One Day International cricketers
Bermuda Twenty20 International cricketers
People from Paget Parish